Cercinthus is a genus of bugs in the tribe Coreini.

References

External links 

 

Coreini
Coreidae genera